Sally Knyvette (born 9 February 1951) is a British actress, theatre director and drama teacher.

Early life
Born Sally James in Horsham, Sussex, the daughter of a doctor, Knyvette lived in France and then Switzerland for nearly twelve years. She returned to London with two French friends, and they started a successful restaurant in Chelsea.

Early career
In Chelsea an actress friend, Tilly Tremayne, encouraged Knyvette to take acting lessons from Beryl Cooke, which she did for two years. Her first work was in a children's theatre company, working in schools. She then acted in repertory theatre for seven years, mostly on stage, including playing Shakespeare roles.

Television career

On screen Knyvette is best known for her roles as Jenna Stannis in the first two seasons of the British science fiction series Blake's 7, Kate Sugden in the soap opera Emmerdale, and Nurse Rowland in the medical soap series General Hospital. She later complained of her Blake's 7 role that Jenna had "started off as this really exciting, intergalactic space pirate, but then she became a sort of housewife on the Liberator".

Other television appearances include: Holby City, The Safe House, Family Affairs, A Touch of Frost, 
Unfinished Business, Casualty, EastEnders, Dalziel and Pascoe, Coronation Street, The Politician's Wife, The Bill, Big Deal, Who Pays the Ferryman?, General Hospital and Z Cars.

She also voiced the part of Doctorman Allan in the Doctor Who audio adventure Spare Parts and that of Carmilla in the video game Castlevania: Lords of Shadow and its sequel, developed by Mercury Steam. She voiced Emiliana Perfetti in the video game Layton's Mystery Journey developed by Level-5.

After leaving Blake's 7 Knyvette studied for an English and drama degree at the University of London. She lives in Fulham, west London.

Notes

External links

1951 births
People from Horsham
Alumni of the University of London
British soap opera actresses
British television actresses
Drama teachers
Living people